Aster neoelegans is a species of flowering plants in the family Asteraceae. It is found in Bhutan, China and India.

References

External links

 Aster neoelegans at Tropicos
 Aster neoelegans at The Plant List

neoelegans
Plants described in 1964
Flora of Bhutan
Flora of China
Flora of India (region)